This is a list of sister cities in the United States state of California. Sister cities, known in Europe as twin towns, are cities which partner with each other to promote human contact and cultural links, although this partnering is not limited to cities and often includes counties, regions, states and other sub-national entities.

Many California jurisdictions work with foreign cities through Sister Cities International, an organization whose goal is to "promote peace through mutual respect, understanding, and cooperation."

A
Alameda

 Dumaguete, Philippines
 Jiangyin, China
 Varazze, Italy
 Yeongdong, South Korea

Alameda County

 Taoyuan, Taiwan
 Zhongshan, China

Alhambra

 Rizhao, China
 Sanya, China

Anaheim

 Mito, Japan
 Vitoria-Gasteiz, Spain

Antioch
 Chichibu, Japan

Arcadia

 Newcastle, Australia
 Tripoli, Greece
 Taizhou, China

Arcata
 Camoapa, Nicaragua

Azusa
 Zacatecas, Mexico

B
Bakersfield

 Amritsar, India
 Bucheon, South Korea
 Cixi, China
 Partyzanski (Minsk), Belarus
 Querétaro, Mexico
 Wakayama, Japan

Baldwin Park

 Taxco de Alarcón, Mexico
 Tototlán, Mexico

Bellflower
 Ahome, Mexico

Benicia
 Tula de Allende, Mexico

Berkeley

 Browning, United States
 Gao, Mali
 Gongju, South Korea
 Haidian (Beijing), China
 Jena, Germany
 León, Nicaragua
 Mathopestad, South Africa
 Oukasie, South Africa
 Palma Soriano, Cuba
 Sakai, Japan
 San Antonio Los Ranchos, El Salvador
 Uma Bawang (Padawan), Malaysia
 Yondó, Colombia

Beverly Hills

 Acapulco, Mexico
 Cannes, France
 Herzliya, Israel
 Pudong (Shanghai), China

Big Bear Lake
 Abtenau, Austria

Brea

 Anseong, South Korea
 Hannō, Japan
 Lagos de Moreno, Mexico

Buena Park
 Seongbuk (Seoul), South Korea

Burbank

 Gaborone, Botswana
 Incheon, South Korea
 Ōta, Japan
 Solna, Sweden

C
Calabasas

 Anqing, China
 Mevaseret Zion, Israel

Carlsbad

 Futtsu, Japan
 Karlovy Vary, Czech Republic

Carson

 La Carlota, Philippines
 Sōka, Japan
 Wanju, South Korea

Cathedral City
 Tequila, Mexico

Cerritos
 Loreto, Mexico

Chula Vista

 Cebu City, Philippines
 Irapuato, Mexico
 Odawara, Japan

Coloma
 Clunes (Hepburn), Australia

Compton

 Apia, Samoa
 Onitsha, Nigeria

Concord
 Kitakami, Japan

Contra Costa County
 Taichung, Taiwan

Corona
 Ocotlán, Mexico

Costa Mesa
 Wyndham, Australia

Covina
 Xalapa, Mexico

Crescent City
  Rikuzentakata, Japan

Culver City

 Capo d'Orlando, Italy
 Iksan, South Korea
 Kaizuka, Japan
 Lethbridge, Canada
 Uruapan, Mexico

Cupertino

 Copertino, Italy
 Bhubaneswar, India
 Hsinchu, Taiwan
 Toyokawa, Japan

D
Daly City
 Quezon City, Philippines

Davis

 Huishan (Wuxi), China 
 Inuyama, Japan
 Los Baños, Philippines
 Muñoz, Philippines
 Qufu, China
 Rutilio Grande, El Salvador
 Sangju, South Korea
 Uman, Ukraine

Delano

 Arida, Japan
 Asti, Italy
 Jacona, Mexico
 Kalibo, Philippines
 Tangancícuaro, Mexico

Dinuba
 Malsch, Germany

Downey

 Alajuela, Costa Rica
 Efrat, Israel

 Fresnillo, Mexico
 Guadalajara, Mexico
 San Quintín, Mexico
 Taghmaconnell, Ireland

Dublin
 Bray, Ireland

E
El Cajon

 Comondu, Mexico
 Sulzfeld, Germany

El Dorado County
 Warabi, Japan

El Monte
 Zamora, Mexico

Elk Grove
 Concepción de Ataco, El Salvador

Encinitas
 Amakusa, Japan

Escondido
 Itoshima, Japan

Eureka

 Kamisu, Japan
 Nelson, New Zealand

F
Fairfield
 Nirasaki, Japan

Folsom

 Jiaohe, China
 Pieve del Grappa, Italy

Fort Bragg
 Ōtsuchi, Japan

Foster City
 Inagi, Japan

Fremont

 Fukaya, Japan
 Horta, Portugal
 Jaipur, India
 Lipa, Philippines
 Puerto Peñasco, Mexico

Fresno

 Châteauroux, France
 Kōchi, Japan
 Münster, Germany
 Taishan, China
 Vagharshapat, Armenia

Fullerton

 Fukui, Japan
 Morelia, Mexico
 Yongin, South Korea

G
Garden Grove
 Anyang, South Korea

Gardena

 Huatabampo, Mexico
 Ichikawa, Japan

Gilroy

 Angra do Heroísmo, Portugal
 Koror, Palau
 Monticelli d'Ongina, Italy
 Saint-Clar, France
 Takko, Japan
 Tecate, Mexico

Glendale

 Boeun, South Korea
 Gimpo, South Korea
 Goseong, South Korea
 Gyumri, Armenia
 Higashiōsaka, Japan
 Kapan, Armenia
 Rosarito Beach, Mexico
 Santiago, Dominican Republic
 Tlaquepaque, Mexico

Glendora
 Mooka, Japan

Grass Valley

 Bodmin, England, United Kingdom
 Limana, Italy

Greenfield
 Acámbaro, Mexico

Grover Beach
 Narvacan, Philippines

Gustine
 Angra do Heroísmo, Portugal

H
Half Moon Bay
 Kariwa, Japan

Hanford
 Setana, Japan

Hayward

 Faro, Portugal
 Funabashi, Japan
 Ghazni, Afghanistan
 Yixing, China

Hemet

 Kushimoto, Japan
 Marumori, Japan

Hercules
 Tsushima, Japan

Hermosa Beach
 Loreto, Mexico

Highland
 Lachin, Azerbaijan

Hollister
 Katō, Japan

Huntington Beach

 Anjō, Japan
 Northern Beaches, Australia

Huntington Park

 Puebla, Mexico
 Rosarito Beach, Mexico
 San Julián, Mexico
 Yahualica de González Gallo, Mexico

I
Imperial Beach
 White Rock, Canada

Irvine

 Hermosillo, Mexico
 Seocho (Seoul), South Korea
 Taoyuan, Taiwan
 Tsukuba, Japan

Irwindale
 Salvatierra, Mexico

K
Kerman
 Kannami, Japan

L
La Cañada Flintridge
 Villanueva de la Cañada, Spain

La Mirada
 Isehara, Japan

Laguna Beach

 Los Cabos, Mexico
 Menton, France
 St Ives, England, United Kingdom

Laguna Niguel
 Al-Qa'im, Iraq

Lathrop
 Bacarra, Philippines

Lindsay
 Ono, Japan

Livermore

 Quetzaltenango, Guatemala
 Snezhinsk, Russia
 Yotsukaidō, Japan

Livingston

 Jalostotitlán, Mexico
 Yingtan, China

Lodi

 Kōfu, Japan
 Lodi, Italy

Loma Linda

 Libertador San Martín, Argentina
 Manipal, India 

Lomita
 Takaishi, Japan

Lompoc

 Cheyenne, United States
 Inca, Spain
 Lake Placid, United States
 Locarno, Switzerland
 Namwon, South Korea

Long Beach

 Mombasa, Kenya
 Phnom Penh, Cambodia
 Qingdao, China
 Sochi, Russia
 Yokkaichi, Japan

Los Altos

 Greater Bendigo, Australia
 Rustington, England, United Kingdom
 Shilin (Taipei), Taiwan
 Syktyvkar, Russia

Los Angeles

 Athens, Greece
 Auckland, New Zealand
 Beirut, Lebanon
 Berlin, Germany
 Bordeaux, France
 Busan, South Korea
 Eilat, Israel
 Giza, Egypt
 Guangzhou, China
 Ischia, Italy
 Jakarta, Indonesia
 Kaunas, Lithuania
 Lusaka, Zambia
 Makati, Philippines
 Mexico City, Mexico
 Mumbai, India
 Nagoya, Japan
 Saint Petersburg, Russia
 Salvador, Brazil
 San Salvador, El Salvador
 Split, Croatia
 Taipei, Taiwan
 Tehran, Iran
 Vancouver, British Columbia, Canada
 Yerevan, Armenia

Los Angeles County
 New Taipei, Taiwan

Los Gatos

 Listowel, Ireland
 Zihuatanejo de Azueta, Mexico

Lynwood

 Aguascalientes, Mexico
 Talpa de Allende, Mexico
 Zacatecas, Mexico

M
Madera
 Yilan, Taiwan

Malibu
 Lijiang, China

Martinez

 Dunbar, Scotland, United Kingdom
 Hanchuan, China
 Isola delle Femmine, Italy
 Milazzo, Italy
 Stresa, Italy

Mendocino
 Ōmachi, Japan

Menlo Park

 Bizen, Japan
 Galway, Ireland
 Kochi, India
 Xinbei (Changzhou), China

Merced

 Albury, Australia

 Somoto, Nicaragua

Millbrae

 Mosta, Malta
 La Serena, Chile

Milpitas

 Dagupan, Philippines
 Huizhou, China
 Tsukuba, Japan

Modesto

 Aguascalientes, Mexico
 Khmelnytskyi, Ukraine
 Kurume, Japan
 Laval, France
 Mengzi, China
 Vernon, Canada
 Vijayawada, India

Montebello

 Ashiya, Japan
 Stepanakert, Azerbaijan

Monterey

 Dubrovnik, Croatia
 Isola delle Femmine, Italy
 Kuşadası, Turkey
 Lankaran, Azerbaijan
 Lleida, Spain
 Nanao, Japan
 Tainan, Taiwan

Monterey Park

 Morelia, Mexico
 Nachikatsuura, Japan
 Quanzhou, China
 Yeongdeungpo (Seoul), South Korea
 Yonghe (New Taipei), Taiwan

Moreno Valley
 San Juan de los Lagos, Mexico

Morgan Hill

 Ameca, Mexico
 Headford, Ireland
 Mizuho, Japan
 San Casciano in Val di Pesa, Italy
 San Martín de Hidalgo, Mexico
 Seferihisar, Turkey

Mountain View

 Hasselt, Belgium
 Iwata, Japan

N
Napa

 Casablanca, Chile
 Iwanuma, Japan
 Launceston, Australia

Nevada City
 Penzance, England, United Kingdom

Newport Beach

 Antibes, France
 Ensenada, Mexico
 Okazaki, Japan

Norwalk

 Hermosillo, Mexico
 Morelia, Mexico

Novato
 Greater Shepparton, Australia

O
Oakland

 Bahir Dar, Ethiopia
 Dalian, China
 Da Nang, Vietnam
 Fukuoka, Japan
 Funchal, Portugal
 Livorno, Italy
 Nakhodka, Russia
 Ocho Rios, Jamaica
 Santiago de Cuba, Cuba
 Sekondi-Takoradi, Ghana

Oceanside

 Fuji, Japan
 Kisarazu, Japan
 Pago Pago, American Samoa

Ontario

 Ahome, Mexico
 Brockville, Canada
 Jieyang, China
 Mocorito, Mexico
 Salvador Alvarado, Mexico

Orange

 Orange, Australia
 Querétaro, Mexico
 Timaru, New Zealand

Orange County
 Tianjin, China

Orinda
 Tábor, Czech Republic

Oxnard
 Ocotlán, Mexico

P
Pacifica
 Balaguer, Spain

Palm Desert

 Gisborne, New Zealand
 Zihuatanejo de Azueta, Mexico

Palmdale
 Poncitlán, Mexico

Palo Alto

 Albi, France
 Enschede, Netherlands
 Heidelberg, Germany
 Linköping, Sweden
 Oaxaca de Juárez, Mexico
 Palo, Philippines
 Tsuchiura, Japan
 Yangpu (Shanghai), China

Paramount
 Tepic, Mexico

Pasadena

 Dakar-Plateau, Senegal
 Hadano, Japan
 Järvenpää, Finland
 Ludwigshafen am Rhein, Germany
 Mishima, Japan
 Vanadzor, Armenia
 Xicheng (Beijing), China

Pico Rivera
 San Luis Potosí, Mexico

Pittsburg

 Isola delle Femmine, Italy
 Pohang, South Korea
 Shimonoseki, Japan
 Yahualica de González Gallo, Mexico

Pleasanton

 Blairgowrie and Rattray, Scotland, United Kingdom
 Fergus (Centre Wellington), Canada
 Tulancingo de Bravo, Mexico

Plymouth
 Jocotepec, Mexico

Porterville

 La Barca, Mexico
 Hamamatsu, Japan

R
Rancho Cordova
 Turrialba, Costa Rica

Rancho Palos Verdes
 Sakura, Japan

Redlands

 Hino, Japan
 Linli, China
 San Miguel de Allende, Mexico

Redondo Beach

 Ensenada, Mexico
 Itoman, Japan
 La Paz, Mexico
 Zhangjiagang, China

Redwood City

 Aguililla, Mexico
 Colima, Mexico
 Zapotlán el Grande, Mexico
 Zhuhai, China

Reedley
 Tongyeong, South Korea

Richmond

 Regla (Havana), Cuba
 Shimada, Japan
 Zhoushan, China

Ridgecrest
 Tepatitlán de Morelos, Mexico

Rio Vista
 Tobishima, Japan

Riverbank

 Fuyang (Hangzhou), China
 Tamazula de Gordiano, Mexico

Riverside

 Cần Thơ, Vietnam
 Cuautla, Mexico
 Ensenada, Mexico
 Erlangen, Germany
 Gangnam (Seoul), South Korea
 Hyderabad, India
 Jiangmen, China
 Obuasi, Ghana
 Sendai, Japan

Rohnert Park
 Hashimoto, Japan

Rosemead

 Keelung, Taiwan
 Zapopan, Mexico

S
Sacramento

 Ashkelon, Israel
 Bethlehem, Palestine
 Chişinău, Moldova
 Hamilton, New Zealand
 Jinan, China
 Liestal, Switzerland
 Manila, Philippines
 Matsuyama, Japan
 Mexicali, Mexico
 Pasay, Philippines
 San Juan de Oriente, Nicaragua
 Yongsan (Seoul), South Korea

Salinas

 Cebu City, Philippines
 Drogheda, Ireland
 Ichikikushikino, Japan
 Jerécuaro, Mexico
 Guanajuato, Mexico
 Seogwipo, South Korea
 Söke, Turkey

San Bernardino

 Centro, Mexico
 Goyang, South Korea
 Herzliya, Israel
 Ifẹ, Nigeria
 Kigali, Rwanda
 Mexicali, Mexico
 Roxas, Philippines
 Tachikawa, Japan
 Tauranga, New Zealand
 Zavolzhye, Russia

San Bernardino County
 Taoyuan, Taiwan

San Bruno
 Narita, Japan

San Carlos

 Metepec, Mexico
 Ōmura, Japan

San Clemente
 San Clemente del Tuyú, Argentina

San Diego

 Alcalá de Henares, Spain
 Campinas, Brazil
 Cavite City, Philippines
 Edinburgh, Scotland, United Kingdom
 Jalalabad, Afghanistan
 Jeonju, South Korea
 Leon, Mexico
 Masovian Voivodeship, Poland
 Panama City, Panama
 Perth, Australia
 Taichung City, Taiwan
 Tema, Ghana
 Tijuana, Mexico
 Vladivostok, Russia

 Yantai, China
 Yokohama, Japan

San Fernando
 Tepatitlán de Morelos, Mexico

San Francisco

 Abidjan, Ivory Coast
 Amman, Jordan
 Assisi, Italy
 Bangalore, India
 Barcelona, Spain
 Cork, Ireland
 Haifa, Israel
 Ho Chi Minh City, Vietnam
 Kiel, Germany
 Kraków, Poland
 Manila, Philippines

 Seoul, South Korea
 Shanghai, China
 Sydney, Australia
 Taipei, Taiwan
 Thessaloniki, Greece
 Zürich, Switzerland

San Gabriel

 Celaya, Mexico
 Changhua, Taiwan

San Jose

 Dublin, Ireland
 Guadalajara, Mexico
 Okayama, Japan
 Pune, India
 San José, Costa Rica
 Tainan, Taiwan
 Veracruz, Mexico
 Yekaterinburg, Russia

San Leandro

 Naga, Philippines
 Ponta Delgada, Portugal
 Ribeirão Preto, Brazil

San Marino
 Tamsui (New Taipei), Taiwan

San Mateo
 Toyonaka, Japan

San Pablo
 Manzanillo, Mexico

San Rafael

 Chiang Mai, Thailand
 Falkirk, Scotland, United Kingdom
 Lonate Pozzolo, Italy
 San Rafael del Norte, Nicaragua

Santa Barbara

 Kotor, Montenegro
 Patras, Greece
 Puerto Vallarta, Mexico
 San Juan, Philippines
 Toba, Japan
 Weihai, China

Santa Clara

 Coimbra, Portugal
 Izumo, Japan
 Limerick, Ireland

Santa Clara County

 Florence Metropolitan City, Italy
 Hsinchu County, Taiwan

Santa Clarita

 Sariaya, Philippines
 Tena, Ecuador

Santa Cruz

 Alushta, Ukraine
 Jinotepe, Nicaragua
 Sestri Levante, Italy
 Shingū, Japan

Santa Fe Springs

 Navojoa, Mexico
 Tirschenreuth, Germany

Santa Monica

 Fujinomiya, Japan
 Hamm, Germany
 Mazatlán, Mexico

Santa Rosa
 Jeju City, South Korea

Saratoga
 Mukō, Japan

Sausalito

 Cascais, Portugal
 Sakaide, Japan
 Viña del Mar, Chile

Scotts Valley
 Nichinan, Japan

Sebastopol

 Chyhyryn, Ukraine
 Takeo, Japan

Solvang
 Aalborg, Denmark

Sonoma

 Aswan, Egypt
 Chambolle-Musigny, France
 Greve in Chianti, Italy
 Kaniv, Ukraine
 Pátzcuaro, Mexico
 Penglai (Yantai), China
 Tokaj, Hungary

Sonora
 Kirishima, Japan

South El Monte

 Gómez Palacio, Mexico
 Kunshan, China

South San Francisco

 Atotonilco El Alto, Mexico
 Kishiwada, Japan
 Lucca, Italy
 Pasig, Philippines
 Saint-Jean-Pied-de-Port, France

Stockton

 Asaba, Nigeria
 Battambang, Cambodia
 Empalme, Mexico
 Foshan, China
 Iloilo City, Philippines
 Parma, Italy
 Shizuoka, Japan

Sunnyvale
 Iizuka, Japan

T
Temecula
 Daisen, Japan

Temple City

 Hawkesbury, Australia
 Magdalena de Kino, Mexico

Thousand Oaks
 Qingdao, China

Torrance
 Kashiwa, Japan

Tracy

 Memuro, Japan
 Velas, Portugal

Tulare

 Angra do Heroísmo, Portugal
 Inverell, Australia

Tustin
 Heyuan, China

U
Union City

 Asadabad, Afghanistan
 Baybay, Philippines
 Chiang Rai, Thailand
 Jalandhar, India
 Liyang, China
 Mulegé, Mexico
 Pasay, Philippines

Upland

 Caborca, Mexico
 Mildura, Australia

V
Vallejo

 Akashi, Japan
 Bagamoyo, Tanzania
 Baguio, Philippines
 Jincheon, South Korea

 Trondheim, Norway

Ventura
 Loreto, Mexico

Visalia

 Miki, Japan
 Putignano, Italy

W
Walnut

 Calamba, Philippines
 Yuyao, China

Walnut Creek

 Noceto, Italy
 Siófok, Hungary

Watsonville

 Cavtat (Konavle), Croatia
 Jocotepec, Mexico
 Kawakami, Japan
 Pinghu, China
 San Pedro Masahuat, El Salvador
 Tangancícuaro, Mexico

West Covina

 Fengtai (Beijing), China
 Ōtawara, Japan

West Sacramento
 Alaminos, Philippines

Whittier
 Changshu, China

Woodland
 La Piedad, Mexico

Y
Yorba Linda

 Huai'an, China
 Tongchuan, China

Yountville

 Kaštela, Croatia
 Todos Santos (La Paz), Mexico

Yuba City
 Toride, Japan

References

California
Sister cities
Populated places in California